Senator Bland may refer to:

James W. D. Bland (1838–1870), Virginia State Senate
Mary Groves Bland (1936–2016), Missouri State Senate
Oscar E. Bland (1877–1951), Indiana State Senate